William Fraser Menmuir (born 3 February 1952) was a Scottish footballer who played for Bristol City, Hearts, Dumbarton and Alloa Athletic.

References

1952 births
Scottish footballers
Bristol City F.C. players
Heart of Midlothian F.C. players
Dumbarton F.C. players
Alloa Athletic F.C. players
Scottish Football League players
Living people
English Football League players
Association football wing halves